David Leslie Smallman was the Governor of Saint Helena, Ascension and Tristan da Cunha between 1995 and 1997. He obtained a promise from HM Government in 1995 to restore British Citizenship to the citizens of St Helena. This happened in 2002, under the Governorship of David Hollamby.

He was the first Governor of Saint Helena to land on Gough Island.

References

Governors of Saint Helena
British colonial governors and administrators in Africa
Possibly living people
Year of birth missing